D10 Motorway is a motorway in the Czech Republic, running northeast from Prague to Mladá Boleslav and Turnov. It forms part of the European route E65.

The sections from Prague have been built since  the 1970s and at that time, it was planned to build the expressway to the Polish border, not only to Turnov. The expressway reached Turnov in 1990. In 1993, the government decided that the section Turnov - Polish border would not be constructed. Thus, it is considered to be the first completed expressway in the Czech Republic.

The motorway, formerly known as R10 Expressway was officially redesignated as Motorway D10 on 1 January 2016.

Gallery

References

External links

R10